is a 2014 Japanese supernatural horror film directed by Takashi Miike. It is based on the first arc of the eponymous manga series by Muneyuki Kaneshiro and Akeji Fujimura. The film was released on home media in the United States by Funimation.

Plot
High school student Shun Takahata spends much of his time playing violent video games. One morning at school, he whines that his life is completely boring but then he suddenly finds himself forced to participate in a game of Daruma-san ga koronda with death as the penalty for losing. When the Daruma doll turns toward the blackboard, it exposes a button on its back that the students can attempt to press to end the game before his timer runs out, but 6 in the class minus Shun dies.

After the game, Shun finds his friend Ichika Akimoto and they make their way to the school gym. There, they play a Maneki Neko, where students dressed as mice attempt to throw a bell into a hoop attached to the collar of a giant beckoning cat, while trying not to be eaten or crushed. The game is won with the aid of Takeru Amaya, a troubled classmate who seems to revel in the opportunity to see so many deaths, and who kills all the other survivors besides Shun and Ichika after winning the game. The three of them are then put out of consciousness by a sleeping gas released by the giant beckoning cat. They wake up to find themselves with other students in a room inside a giant cube hovering over Tokyo, facing the next test: students all over Japan and elsewhere in the world face similar tests, and the handful of survivors are being brought inside walls.

The next game is Kagome Kagome, where the students have to be blindfolded and will guess which of four floating Kokeshi wooden dolls is behind them within 10 seconds after the end of a short song. If they fail to do so, they will be hit with a red laser and the dolls will use telekinesis to destroy their bodies. If the Kokeshi lose, they will explode and one of them releases an answer key which opens the doors and frees the students to the next level. Shun meets and saves Shoko Takase by winning the game, and they reunite with Ichika and Yukio Sanada, whom they save from being killed by a fifth Kokeshi by holding their hands.

The four join Eiji Oku and Kotaro Maeda to the next level, where they have to use their keys to unlock a giant smiling head. Amaya brings in three more keys and kills a prisoner that he brought into the room. The seven survivors use their keys, and the giant head rolls away to dig a tunnel into the next room. Meanwhile, each player is displayed on television screens for the others to see. The next game is Shirokuma, a white polar bear that appears to them inside a frozen room. The students have to all answer the white bear's questions honestly, otherwise, they will be forced to single out the one that they suspect to be lying to be killed. Shoko and Yukio get killed, and Shun soon realizes that the bear is the true liar and that its real color is black, therefore winning the game and surviving with the other four students.

The final game, presented by a Matryoshka doll, is a game of kick the can that must be completed before sundown. The remaining five each pick a stick, and who gets the red one plays the "Devil". Whoever's face is seen and gets called out by the "Devil", is caught and thrown into a cell. Kicking the can in the middle will make it explode, killing nearby players. Takeru gets the red stick and soon three students are caught while Shun finds armor to conceal his face. Shun falls into the sea while chaining Takeru to the armor. As Takeru fights to pull the armor up to avoid being pulled down, Shun climbs back up, having freed himself from the armor. Both race towards the can, and Shun succeeds in kicking the can first, thereby winning the game. The Matryoshka doll reveals that in fact, the explosion is a lie and that none of them will be killed by losing the game. They have a popsicle party, where they learn their fates on the wooden stick, and that the intention of the last game was simply for entertainment. Shun and Takeru live while Ichika, Eiji, and Kotaro are killed by a Matryoshka doll with lasers that disintegrates them. Shun and Takeru emerge to the top of the cube, where they see crowds cheer for them, while a hikikomori, who has been watching them from his room, goes out of his house, possibly to find the real identity of "God".

Takeru celebrates while Shun kneels in despair from all of his losses, stating that "there is no God". One of the Matryoshka dolls corrects him and suggests that those deadly games will lead them to "God", as it shows him a vagrant who was also an observer of those games and the "God" behind these death games.

Cast
Sota Fukushi as Shun Takahata
Hirona Yamazaki as Ichika Akimoto
Ryūnosuke Kamiki as Takeru Amaya
Mio Yūki as Shoko Takase
Shōta Sometani as Satake
Jingi Irie as Eiji Oku
Ryosuke Yamamoto as Mikinori Taira
Minori Hagiwara as Yumi Taoka
Sasuke Otsuru as Yukio Sanada
Naoto Takahashi as Kotaro Maeda
Nijiro Murakami as Haruhiko Yoshikawa
Lily Franky as Homeless man/God
Nao Omori as Takumi
Dori Sakurada as Class president (cameo)
Atsuko Maeda as Maneki-neko (voice)
Tsutomu Yamazaki as Polar Bear (voice)

Box office
The film earned $1.5 million domestically in Japan in its first weekend in November.

Controversy 
The 2021 survival thriller K-drama series Squid Game has been accused of plagiarizing the movie, as both involve children's games where the penalty for losing is death. However, writer-director Hwang Dong-hyuk claimed he wrote Squid Game's script in 2009 (5 years before As the Gods Will was released), saying "the similarities that were pointed out are purely coincidental and there is no copying from either party.”

References

External links
 

2014 horror films
2010s Japanese films
2010s science fiction horror films
Films directed by Takashi Miike
Funimation
Japanese high school films
Japanese science fiction horror films
Live-action films based on manga
Japanese supernatural horror films
Films about death games